"King of My Castle" is a song by American electronic music producer Chris Brann under his Wamdue Project alias, with vocals by Gaelle Adisson. It was originally released in 1997 as a downtempo song but became a worldwide club hit in 1999 when it was remixed by Italian house producer Roy Malone and included on the 1998 album Program Yourself. The song peaked at number one on the US Billboard Dance Club Play chart, topped the UK Singles Chart, and peaked within the top 10 in at least 12 other countries, including Denmark, France, Germany, the Netherlands, and Norway.

Song information
The song's title and lyrics reference Sigmund Freud's theory of the unconscious which holds that the human ego is not free and is instead controlled by its own unconscious id (see Id, ego and super-ego)—in Freud's own words, "das Ich ist nicht Herr im eigenen Hause" ("the ego is not king of its own castle"). Hence, one of the song's two music videos consists of footage from the 1995 anime film Ghost in the Shell, where people with cyborg implants have their actions controlled against their will by a hacker criminal known in the film as "puppetmaster".

Track listings

1998 release

UK CD single
 "King of My Castle" (original edit)
 "King of My Castle" (Beef Injection mix)
 "King of My Castle" (original version)
 "King of My Castle" (S' Man's Comin 4 Ya Castle mix)
 "King of My Castle" (Charles Schillings Toboggan mix)
 "King of My Castle" (Bronx Dogs mix)

UK 12-inch single
A1. "King of My Castle" (original version)
B1. "King of My Castle" (S' Man's Comin 4 Ya Castle mix)
B2. "King of My Castle" (Beef Injection mix)

European CD single
 "King of My Castle" (Roy Malone's King radio edit) – 3:40
 "King of My Castle" (S' Man's Comin 4 Ya Castle radio edit) – 3:11

Australian CD single
 "King of My Castle" (Roy Malone's King edit)
 "King of My Castle" (Roy Malone's King mix)
 "King of My Castle" (original mix)
 "King of My Castle" (S' Man's Comin 4 Ya Castle mix)
 "King of My Castle" (Charles Schilling Toboggan mix)

1999 release

US 12-inch single
A1. "King of My Castle" (Roy Malone's King mix) – 4:56
A2. "King of My Castle" (Armins Gimmick dub) – 6:19
B1. "King of My Castle" (Bini & Martini 999 mix) – 6:27
B2. "King of My Castle" (Bini & Martini 999 dub) – 7:44

UK CD single
 "King of My Castle" (Roy Malone's King radio edit) – 3:25
 "King of My Castle" (Armin van Buuren remix) – 6:22
 "King of My Castle" (Bini & Martini 999 mix) – 6:25
 "King of My Castle" (original radio edit) – 3:37

UK 12-inch single
A1. "King of My Castle" (Bini & Martini 999 mix) – 7:44
AA1. "King of My Castle" (Armin van Buuren remix) – 6:22
AA2. "King of My Castle" (Roy Malone's King mix) – 4:56

UK cassette single
 "King of My Castle" (Roy Malone's King radio edit)
 "King of My Castle" (Armin van Buuren remix)
 "King of My Castle" (S' Man's Comin 4 Ya Castle)

Dutch CD single
 "King of My Castle" (Roy Malone's King radio edit) – 3:42
 "King of My Castle" (original version) – 8:11

Australian and New Zealand CD single
 "King of My Castle" (Armin van Buuren radio edit) – 3:43
 "King of My Castle" (Roy Malone's King radio) – 3:33
 "King of My Castle" (Armin van Buuren remix) – 6:22
 "King of My Castle" (Bini & Martini 999 mix) – 6:25
 "King of My Castle" (original radio edit) – 3:37

Charts

Weekly charts
Original version

2009 version

Year-end charts
Original version

2009 version

Certifications

Release history

Cover versions
In 2009, "King of My Castle" was covered as a duet by singers Shayne Ward and Britney Spears, intended for Ward's album Obsession. Ward sings new lyrics while Spears's parts largely follow the original version. For unknown reasons, it was never released, but their version leaked online in 2021. A version solely featuring Spears also leaked online months later.

References

1997 songs
1998 singles
2009 singles
AM PM Records singles
American house music songs
Animated music videos
Number-one singles in Scotland
Republic Records singles
Strictly Rhythm singles
UK Singles Chart number-one singles